Michael P. Sikich (born March 3, 1949) is a former American football guard who played for the Cleveland Browns in the National Football League (NFL). He played college football at Northwestern University. He also played for the Chicago Fire of the World Football League (WFL).

References 

1949 births
Living people
American football offensive guards
Northwestern Wildcats football players
Cleveland Browns players